Events from the year 1991 in art.

Events
14 April – In the Netherlands, thieves steal 20 paintings worth $500 million from the Van Gogh Museum in Amsterdam. Less than an hour later they are found in an abandoned car near the museum.
25 May – Opening of the Irish Museum of Modern Art in Dublin.
9 July – The Sainsbury Wing of the National Gallery in London, designed by Robert Venturi and Denise Scott, is opened.
September – Opening of the Weserburg modern art museum in Bremen (Germany) as the Neues Museum Weserburg Bremen.

Publications
The Prince of Wales (now Charles III) - Watercolours.
Eric Hebborn, Drawn to Trouble

Exhibitions
February 6 until May 6 - Albert Bierstadt, Art & Enterprise at the Brooklyn Museum in Brooklyn, New York. 
December 13 until February 2, 1992 - Damien Hirst solo exhibition at Institute of Contemporary Arts.

Dance
May – First performance of Candoco Dance Company

Awards
John Moores Painting Prize -  Andrzej Jackowski for "The Beekeeper's son"
Turner Prize – Anish Kapoor

Works

Las niñas en la alborada – Félix Arauz
"The Umbrellas" (simultaneous sculptural instillations in California, U.S.A and Japan) - Christo and Jeanne Claude
[[Chain Reaction (sculpture)|Chain Reaction]] (sculpture, Santa Monica, California) – Paul ConradField (multiple figure sculptures in terracotta - first version) – Antony GormleyIsolated Elements Swimming in the Same Direction for the Purposes of Understanding – Damien HirstThe Physical Impossibility of Death in the Mind of Someone Living – Damien HirstCapitalism (sculpture in Portland, Oregon) – Larry KirklandGuardians of the Gate (bronze, San Francisco) – Miles MetzgerCold Dark Matter: An Exploded View (installation) – Cornelia ParkerSelf (sculpted self-portrait head in artist's blood - first version) – Marc QuinnHost Analog (sculpture, Portland, Oregon) – Buster SimpsonCascade Charley'' (fountain, Eugene, Oregon) – Alice Wingwall

Births
 Hannah Levy, American sculptor
Probable date – Cartяain, English graffiti urban artist.

Deaths

January to June
3 January – Doris Zinkeisen, British theatrical designer and commercial artist (b. 1898).
11 January – Charles Mozley, British artist and art teacher (b. 1914)
7 February – Jean-Paul Mousseau, Canadian artist (b. 1927).
13 February – Arno Breker, German sculptor (b. 1900).
15 March – Vladimir Seleznev, Russian painter (b. 1928).
29 March – Guy Bourdin, French photographer (b. 1928).
10 June – Jean Bruller, French writer and illustrator (b. 1902).

July to December
16 July – Robert Motherwell, American abstract expressionist painter and printmaker (b. 1915).
3 August – Boris Ugarov, Russian painter, a last President of the Academy of Arts of the USSR (b. 1922).
30 August – Jean Tinguely, Swiss painter and sculptor (b. 1925).
5 September
Alexander Pushnin, Russian painter and art educator (b. 1921).
Princess Fahrelnissa Zeid, Turkish abstract artist (b. 1901).
14 September – Russell Lynes, American art historian, photographer and author (b. 1910).
18 September - Leland Bell, American painter (b. 1922).
24 September – Dr. Seuss, American illustrator (b. 1904).
8 October – David Budd, American abstract painter (b. 1927)
27 October – Pyke Koch, Dutch painter (b. 1901).
7 November – Tom of Finland, Finnish fetish artist (b. 1920).
11 November – Nadezhda Shteinmiller, Russian painter and theater artist (b. 1915).
18 November – Reg Parlett, English comics artist (b. 1904).
21 November – Joseph Delaney, American painter (b. 1904).
8 December - Bernice Abbott, American photographer (b. 1898).
9 December – Gisèle Lestrange, French graphic artist (b. 1927).
10 December – Greta Kempton, Austrian-American artist (b. 1901).
12 December - Moshe Castel, Israeli painter (b. 1909).

See also 
 1991 in Fine Arts of the Soviet Union

References

 
 
Years of the 20th century in art
1990s in art